The 76th Assembly District of Wisconsin is one of 99 districts in the Wisconsin State Assembly.  Located in south-central Wisconsin, the district is contained entirely within the city of Madison in central Dane County, and covers all of the Madison Isthmus.  It comprises much of downtown Madison, including the Wisconsin State Capitol, the Wisconsin Historical Society, the historic State Street pedestrian mall, the Kohl Center, and part of the University of Wisconsin–Madison campus.  The district is represented by Democrat Francesca Hong, since January 2021. Representative Hong is the first—and, currently, the only—Asian America member of the Wisconsin Legislature.

The 76th Assembly District is located within Wisconsin's 26th Senate district, along with the 77th and 78th Assembly districts.

List of past representatives

References 

Wisconsin State Assembly districts
Dane County, Wisconsin